Gerson Rodrigues (born 16 June 1988 in Rotterdam) is a Dutch footballer who played for Eerste Divisie club FC Dordrecht during the 2006-2008 football seasons.

References

External links
voetbal international profile

1988 births
Living people
Dutch people of Cape Verdean descent
Footballers from Rotterdam
Dutch footballers
FC Dordrecht players
Eerste Divisie players
Association football defenders